Rhinephyllum is a genus of flowering plants belonging to the family Aizoaceae.

Its native range is Southern Africa.

Species:

Rhinephyllum broomii 
Rhinephyllum comptonii 
Rhinephyllum graniforme 
Rhinephyllum inaequale 
Rhinephyllum luteum 
Rhinephyllum muirii 
Rhinephyllum obliquum 
Rhinephyllum parvifolium 
Rhinephyllum pillansii 
Rhinephyllum schonlandii 
Rhinephyllum verdoorniae

References

Aizoaceae
Aizoaceae genera
Taxa named by N. E. Brown